Savchuk, also spelled Sawchuk or Sawczuk, is a common Ukrainian family name and may refer to the following:

People

Savchuk
 Anastasiya Savchuk (born 1996), Ukrainian synchronized swimmer
 Boris Savchuk (1943–1996), Ukrainian sprinter
 Hlib Savchuk (born 2003), Ukrainian footballer
 Olga Savchuk (born 1987), Ukrainian tennis player
 Roman Turovsky-Savchuk (born 1961), American artist
 Valentyna Savchuk (born 1975), Ukrainian race walker
 Vladyslav Savchuk (born 1979), Ukrainian footballer

Other forms
 Bill Sawchuk (born 1959), Canadian swimmer
 Kim Sawchuk (born 1960), Canadian academic
 Michael Sawchuk (1911–1969), Canadian politician
 Terry Sawchuk (1929–1970), Canadian ice hockey goaltender
 Piotr Sawczuk (born 1962), Polish Roman Catholic bishop

See also
 
 

Surnames of Ukrainian origin
Ukrainian-language surnames